Tegeticula synthetica is a moth of the family Prodoxidae. It is found in the United States in the Mojave Desert in southern Nevada, south-eastern California and from south-western Utah to north-western Arizona. The habitat consists of desert areas.

The wingspan is 17–21 mm. The forewings are black with lighter scales scattered on the wing. The hindwings are also black, but very lightly scaled.

The larvae feed on Yucca brevifolia. They feed on developing seeds. Pupation takes place in a cocoon in the soil.

References

Moths described in 1892
Prodoxidae